Mr. Virgin is a 2018 Nepali comedy-drama film, directed by Bisharad Basnet in his debut. The film revolves around three men in their mid-thirties, who seek to lose their virginity. The film features Bijay Baral, Chhulthim Dolma Gurung, Rabindra Jha, Kamal Mani Nepal, Gaurav Pahari, Mariska Pokharel, Bholaraj Sapkota, and Srijana Subba.

Plot 
Three men — Dhal Bahadur (Gaurav Pahari), Pavitra Prassad (Bijay Baral), and Kumar Kancha (Kamal Mani Nepal) — are in their mid-thirties. After Chumman Lal (Bholaraj Sapkota) jokes about them still being virgins, they set out to lose their virginity. While searching for girls, they go to Thamel where they meet Pyasi Mohan (Rabindra Jha), a taxi driver, who takes advantage of them.

Cast 

 Bijay Baral as Pavitra Parsad
 Chhulthim Dolma Gurung
 Rabindra Jha as Mohan
 Kamal Mani Nepal as Kumar
 Gaurav Pahari as Dal Bahadur
 Mariska Pokharel as Roji
 Bholaraj Sapkota as Chumman Lal
 Srijana Subba

Production 
Before playing her role as an escort, actress Mariska Pokharel researched the daily life and lifestyle of call girls. Pokharel said that there were actresses who turned down the role because of the title of the film. She told The Kathmandu Post, "But I found the project compelling and couldn't wait to get started". The film marked the debut for the director Bisharad Basnet.

Soundtrack

Critical reception 
The Kathmandu Post reported that the film received public criticism for its suggestive title. Gaurav Pahari, the lead actor, responded that notwithstanding its name, the film was not vulgar. He said: "We have tried to explore sexuality and psychology in the film. But just because we have taken a new approach doesn't mean that the film is in anyway vulgar. Experimental yes, but not vulgar. We are hoping to break new ground by bringing what might be Nepal's first sex comedy to screen".

Shashwat Pant of Onlinekhabar wrote, "For a comedy movie, Mr. Virgin does not make the audience laugh. Its inappropriate jokes and clichéd dialogue makes the audience cringe throughout the two hours. Overall the movie is a poor watch".

References

External links 
 

2018 comedy-drama films
Films about virginity
2018 directorial debut films
Nepalese comedy-drama films
Films shot in Kathmandu